Somwarpet (somavārapēte, also written Somvarpet)  is a panchayat town in Coorg district in the Indian state of Karnataka.  It is the main town of the Somwarpet taluk, in the north-east of the district.
2nd highest Administrative town in Karnataka in terms of elevation.
The main crops grown in the area are coffee and spice crops such as cardamom, peppers, oranges, ginger and vegetables.

Rainfall 
Based on the reports of KSNDMC taken from 2018 to 2020, Somwarpet Town received on an average, annual rainfall of 2125 mm.

Transportation 
Karnataka State RTC Bus Service offer inter-district travel. Private bus service operate within Coorg only. Nearest railway junction is Hassan Junction railway station about 70 km. Nearest International Airport is Kannur International Airport (120 km) and Mangalore International Airport (160 km).

Demographics 

 India census, Somwarpet had a population of 7218. Males constitute 50% of the population and females 50%.  Somvarpet has an average literacy rate of 75%, higher than the national average of 59.5%: male literacy is 80%, and female literacy is 70%.  In Somvarpet, 12% of the population is under 6 years of age.

Kannada, Tulu, Are Bhashe, Kodava Takk, Beary bashe, Konkani and English are spoken by the people.

Flora and fauna 

Coffee is the major crop in the region. It is the major Arabica coffee growing region of India. Other crops like pepper, cardamom, orange, vanilla are grown. Rice, ginger is also grown.

Tourist attractions 

Beluru Golf Club 
Beluru Golf Club is located 8 km from Somwarpet town. The lush green golf ground attracts movie makers.

Male Malleshwara Betta
Male Malleshwara Betta is located 13 km from Somwarpet and 7 km from Shanivarsanthe. Pooja is conducted regularly and a Grand Celebration on Maha Shivarathri every year.

Kotebetta
Kotebetta is the third highest peak in Coorg after Tadiandamol and Kumara Parvatha, Kotebetta means "Fort Hill" because of its fort-like appearance. Its height above sea level is 1620 metres (5313 ft). It lies near the border between the Dakshina Kannada and Coorg districts. The trek starting point is a junction near a bridge called Hattihole. The peak is 10 km from Hattihole. There is a Shiva temple at the base of Kotebetta.

Makkalagudi Betta is located in Kiraganduru 10 km between Somwarpet and Madikeri road. There is a view of paddy fields, forest, and the waters of the Harangi reservoir.

Dubare Elephant Camp

One of the most interesting places in Coorg is the Dubare Elephant camp which is situated on the banks of River Kaveri. Here people can give a bath and feed elephants can also take a ride on the elephants and spot gaur, crocodiles, sloth bears, and wild creatures & lush greeneries.

Mallalli Falls  (Kannada:ಮಲ್ಲಳ್ಳಿ ಜಲಪಾತ)
Mallalli Abbi or Kumaradhara Falls is one of the tallest waterfalls in the Coorg where the river Kumaradhara drops down 200 feet. Scattered along the stream are other misty waterfalls, situated on the foothills of the Pushpagiri hill-ranges, 25 km from Somwarpet.

"Beauty Spot" in mathanahaill, somwarpet, saniversante road. " Mountain Mist coffee valley"

Other attractions in the Taluk are
Kushalanagar, a popular tourist destination located southerly, along Mysore–Madikeri road. Bylakuppe Tibetan settlement is located close to this town 
Harangi Reservoir
Kanive Hanging Bride and Kudige 
Kaveri Nisargadhama
Dubare elephant camp
Chiklihole reservoir
Nagarhole National Park
Mallalli falls located near Mallalli which is nearly 18 km from Somawarpet
Kumara Parvata trek.
Betttarashi betta
Silent falls
Doodakalu betta
Gantukallu Betta

Accommodations 

Somwarpet is well connected with major tourist attractions in the Coorg district. It is established with several hotels, homestays & resorts for accommodating travelers.

See also 

 Madikeri
 Mangalore
 Virajpet
 Kushalanagar

References

External links 

.
CoorgCreek.com Coorg Tourism
Somwarpet places

Cities and towns in Kodagu district
Populated places in the Western Ghats
Tourism in Karnataka
Hill stations in Karnataka